The Only Easy Day Was Yesterday is an EP from the American rock band 12 Stones. It was released on July 20, 2010, by Wind-up Records and debuted at No. 103 on the Billboard 200. The album's title is a reference to the motto of the U.S. Navy SEALs.

"We Are One" was the theme song of the professional wrestling stable, The Nexus, the Washington Capitals, darts player Paul Nicholson, and was used as a fight song of the Philadelphia Flyers on April 14, 2012, for the game three of their playoff series against the Pittsburgh Penguins.

Track listing

Singles
 "We Are One"
 "Disappear"

References

2010 debut EPs
12 Stones albums
Wind-up Records EPs